Taishang may refer to:

Taishang (台商), an informal term for Taiwanese businesspeople in mainland China
Taishang (太上, 405–410), era name used by Murong Chao, emperor of Southern Yan
Taishang, Jilin (台上), a town in Ji'an, Jilin, China

See also
Taishan (disambiguation)